José Reyes Rodríguez (born 4 January 1906, date of death unknown) was a Mexican sports shooter. He competed at the 1948 Summer Olympics and 1952 Summer Olympics.

References

1906 births
Year of death missing
Mexican male sport shooters
Olympic shooters of Mexico
Shooters at the 1948 Summer Olympics
Shooters at the 1952 Summer Olympics
Place of birth missing
Pan American Games medalists in shooting
Pan American Games gold medalists for Mexico
Pan American Games bronze medalists for Mexico
Shooters at the 1951 Pan American Games
Shooters at the 1955 Pan American Games
Medalists at the 1951 Pan American Games
20th-century Mexican people